Centaurea collina is a species of Centaurea found in Portugal.

References

External links

collina
Plants described in 1753
Taxa named by Carl Linnaeus